Mikayil Mikayilov (born July 21, 1981, Azerbaijan, Baku) is a theater director, film director, actor, and choreographer.

Early life and education
Mikayilov was born in Baku, Azerbaijan. Graduated from the Baku Choreography Institute in 2000. Graduated from the Azerbaijan State University of Culture and Art with a magister degree in directing.

Filmography
 2002 "Carmen"
 2002 "A Winter Saturday Right after the Flood"
 2004 "Once upon a Time"
 2005 "The Dead and The Alive
 Pəri qala (film, 2007)
 2015 "Phenomenon"

Theater
 VIY (2005)
 SNAKE SKIN (2006)
 BEGGAR SON OF THE MILLIONAIRE (2007)
 WAVES (2009)

References 
 https://web.archive.org/web/20170322045123/http://www.chekhovfest.ru/mkts/xronika/
 http://www.trend.az/life/culture/2449331.html
 http://www.mediawavearchivum.hu/index.php?nyelv=eng&modul=filmek&kod=1191
 https://web.archive.org/web/20170303043257/http://www.chekhovfest.ru/mkts/projects/spec/1864/
 http://www.mediawavearchivum.hu/index.php?nyelv=eng&modul=filmek&kod=1191

1981 births
Living people
Azerbaijani film directors
Azerbaijani theatre directors